The FineMark Women's Pro Tennis Championship is a tournament for professional female tennis players played on outdoor clay courts. The event is classified as a $100,000 ITF Women's Circuit tournament and has been held in Bonita Springs, Florida, United States, since 2019.

Past finals

Singles

Doubles

External links 
 ITF search 
 Website

ITF Women's World Tennis Tour
Clay court tennis tournaments
Tennis tournaments in the United States
Recurring sporting events established in 2019